Robert Ernest Warner has been Vice-Chancellor of Plymouth Marjon University since 2017. Having previously held the position of Executive Dean of Humanities & Professor of Religion, Culture and Society at the University of Chester.

He was educated at Reigate Grammar School, Woking Grammar School, The Judd School, the University of York (BA; MA, English and Related Literature), Regent's Park College, Oxford (MA, Theology), and completed his PhD in theology at King's College London in 2006.

References

Living people
People educated at Reigate Grammar School
People educated at The Judd School
Alumni of the University of York
Alumni of Regent's Park College, Oxford
Alumni of King's College London
Year of birth missing (living people)